Corpus Christi, is a Venezuelan action film written by Carlos Tabares and directed by César Bolívar and released in June 2014.

Plot 
Shortly before the celebration of the Festival, the leader of the brotherhood of Devils dancing appears dead. Milton Ventura, police and brother of the deceased, returns to the village, after 30 years of absence, to clarify the case. Confronting the interests that oppose him and the demons of their past, Milton discovers that his brother's death involves a painful expose truth.

Cast 
Carlos Cruz as Milton Ventura
Guillermo Cruz as Young Milton
Jariana Armas as Aurora Morell
Marcos Moreno as Miguel Ventura
Mirtha Borges as Mamá Toña
Pedro Laya as Abel Ventura
Mayra Africano as Lucrecia de Ventura
Framk Maneiro as Urbano Morell
Julio César Castro as Crescencio Peralta
Malena Alvarado as Mireya de Peralta
Alexander Solórzano as Comisario Roberto

References

External links 
 

2014 films
Venezuelan action films
2010s Spanish-language films